A patronal feast or patronal festival is a yearly celebration dedicated, in countries influenced by Christianity, to the "heavenly advocate" or "patron" of the location holding the festival, who is a saint or virgin. The day of this celebration is called patronal feast day, patronal day or patron day of said location.

Patronal festivals may reflect national holidays (e.g. the feast of Saint George, patron saint of England, Georgia, Bulgaria, Romania, Portugal, and various regions of Spain), but they usually reflect the celebration of a single city or town.
In larger cities, there may even be several festivals, usually about the patron saint of the local parish.

Celebration 
Depending to the budget, patronal festivals may run from one day to five days.
The festivities usually include religious processions honoring its Catholic heritage. However, elements of local culture have been incorporated as well.

Usually, town members adorn the town streets with colorful decorations and other things.

Most patronal festivals feature traditional fairs known as verbenas (plural: sagre), possibly including elements typical of the travelling carnivals.
They feature parades, artisans, street vendors, regional food stands, amusement rides, games, and live entertainment, among other things.
There are usually alcoholic beverages—wine and beer—and music and dancing, either organized or spontaneously; in Southern Italy and Argentina, for example, folk dances known as tarantellas are very common.

In Europe

Austria and Germany

France

Italy 

Examples
Feast of Our Lady of the Hens on the Second Sunday of Easter in Pagani, Campania
Feast of Saints Francis and Catherine
Feast of San Gennaro

Spain 

Examples
Fiestas del Pilar around 12 October in Zaragoza
La Mercè around 24 September in Barcelona
Fallas around 19 March in Valencia
Bonfires of Saint John around 24 June in Alicante
Festival of San Fermín around 7 July in Pamplona
San Isidro Labrador around 15 May in rural areas mostly in Extremadura and Andalusia

Wales

In Latin America

Puerto Rico 

Most Latin American countries dedicate the first day to the saint or virgin being celebrated, the others to entertainment, but in Puerto Rico the musical and entertainment festivities begin right away.

Further examples 
 Feast of Saint Francis of Assisi on 4 October, in Yucuaquín (El Salvador), in Somerville, Massachusetts (US) and in Italy
 Festa de São João do Porto around 23 June in Porto (Portugal)

Serbia 

In Serbian culture, instead of local patron saints, people celebrate family's patron saints. These celebrations are known as 'slava' in Serbia.

See also 

 Kermesse (festival)
 Calendar of saints
 Christian culture
 Civil religion
 Holyday
 Patron saints of places
 Patronages of the Immaculate Conception

Notes and references

Notes

References

External links 

 
 

 
French culture
Irish culture
Italian culture
Spanish culture
Festivals in France
Festivals in Ireland
Festivals in Italy
Festivals in Spain
Latin American festivals